Farwanti Tamang is a Bharatiya Janata Party politician from Sikkim. She has been elected in Sikkim Legislative Assembly election in 2019 from Melli constituency as candidate of Sikkim Democratic Front but later she joined Bharatiya Janata Party.

References 

Living people
Bharatiya Janata Party politicians from Sikkim
Sikkim MLAs 2019–2024
Sikkim Democratic Front politicians
Year of birth missing (living people)
People from Namchi district
Tamang people